The North Adams strike (also called North Adams Scandal) was a strike in 1870 by shoe workers of the Order of the Knights of St. Crispin, against Calvin T. Sampson's Shoe factory, in North Adams, Massachusetts. The strike itself was broken when the factory superintendent, George W. Chase, fired the Irish workers, replacing them with newly employed seventy-five Chinese men from California. Bringing national attention to North Adams, the event started a nation-wide trend of bringing in scab labor and helped perpetuate the concept of immigrants coming to the United States to steal jobs, which led to much hostility towards Chinese immigrants across the nation.

Legacy

The incident sparked widespread working-class protest across the country, shaped legislative debate in Congress, and helped make Chinese immigration a sustained national issue. Twelve years later, the United States passed the Chinese Exclusion Act, barring most Chinese immigrants from entering the country. The Chinese Exclusion Act was the first major anti-immigration law in American history.

References

Sources

Labor disputes in Massachusetts
1870 labor disputes and strikes
North Adams, Massachusetts
History of Berkshire County, Massachusetts
Asian-American culture in Massachusetts
1870 in Massachusetts